Robin Derrick (born 29 May 1962) is a British fashion, portrait, flower, and still life photographer and the creative director of British Vogue.

Biography
Robin Derrick was born on 29 May 1962, in England. He currently lives in London with his wife, make-up artist Lisa Eldridge.

At sixteen years old, Robin Derrick was an A-level student at Filton Technical College in Bristol, England. He was inspired when he walked into a lecture and found an October 1976 Diamond Jubilee copy of Vogue with a  cut-glass logo and a plain red  cover that had been left on his desk. He cut out all the pictures and put them on his bedroom wall.

Professional Work
His editorial client list includes Vogue (British, German, Spanish, and Japanese), Glamour (British and Glamour), 10 Magazine, GQ, Dolce Vita. His advertising client list includes Giorgo Armani, Rimmel, Monsoon, Phase 8, Levis, E45, Nestle, Lux, Umberto Giannini, Clairol, Bacardi, Boots, and Air France.

Additionally, he has co-edited three photography books, including Unseen Vogue: The Secret History Of Fashion Photography, and People in Vogue: A Century of Portrait Photography, and has shown his own work.

He worked for Vogue UK from 1994 to 2011, becoming Creative Director.

Awards
Two-time winner of the PPA Magazine Designer of the Year Award

Photo Books
Vogue Model, Robin Derrick, Robin Muir, Little, Brown Book Group Limited, 2010, 
Vogue Covers: On Fashion's Front Page by Robin Derrick and Robin Muir - Little, Brown Book Group 2008; Little, Brown Book Group Limited, 2010,  
People in Vogue: A Century of Portraits by Robin Derrick and Robin Muir - Little, Brown Book Group 2005, 
Unseen Vogue: The Secret History of Fashion Photography by Robin Derrick and Robin Muir, Little, Brown Book Group Limited, 2004,

Family
He is married to Lisa Eldridge; they have 2 sons and 4 cats.

References

External links
 Robin Derrick's website
 Robin Derrick's Portfolio at Camilla Lowther Management

1960 births
Living people
Photographers from Bristol